Scopula xanthocephalata is a moth of the family Geometridae. It is endemic to Brazil.

References

Moths described in 1858
xanthocephalata
Taxa named by Achille Guenée
Moths of South America